This is a list of Lithuanians, both people of Lithuanian descent and people with the birthplace or citizenship of Lithuania.

In a case when a person was born in the territory of former Grand Duchy of Lithuania and not in the territory of modern Lithuania, only persons, who named themselves Lithuanians or were strictly connected to Lithuania in other way, are included.

Arts

Architecture and sculpture 

Robertas Antinis Jr. (1946–) – sculptor and artist

Gediminas Baravykas (1940–1995) – one of the best-known Soviet architects
Vytautas Brėdikis (1930–) (:lt:Vytautas Brėdikis) – planner of Antakalnis and Lazdynai microdistricts in Vilnius
Algimantas Bublys (1941–) (:lt:Algimantas Bublys) – well known for his modern architecture both in Lithuania and the U.S.
Vincas Grybas (1890–1940) – influential early monumental sculptor
Laurynas Gucevičius (1753–1798) – architect of Vilnius Cathedral
Marcus Illions (1871–1949) – carousel designer and carver
Juozas Kalinauskas – professional sculptor and medalist
Gintaras Karosas (1968–) – sculptor, founder of Europos Parkas
Vytautas Landsbergis-Žemkalnis (1893–1993) (:lt:Vytautas Landsbergis-Žemkalnis) – famous architect in the interwar Lithuania
Juozas Mikėnas (1901–1964) (:lt:Juozas Mikėnas) – sculptor
Algimantas Nasvytis (1928–2018) – architect, Minister of Construction and Urbanism (1990)
Kęstutis Pempė (1949–) (:lt:Kęstutis Pempė) – architect, chairman of the Architects Association of Lithuania
Bronius Pundzius (1907–1959) (:lt:Bronius Pundzius) – sculptor
Petras Rimša (1881–1961) – one of the first professional sculptors in Lithuania
Juozas Zikaras (1881–1944) – sculptor and designer the interwar years' Lithuanian litas

Literature 

Jurgis Baltrušaitis (1873–1944) – poet and diplomat, the first Symbolist poet
Antanas Baranauskas (1835–1902) – priest and poet, author of The Pine Groove of Anykščiai (Lithuanian: Anykščių šilelis)
Kazys Binkis (1893–1942) – poet and playwright, leader of Lithuanian Futurism movement
Bernardas Brazdžionis (1907–2002) – influential romantic poet
Petras Cvirka (1909–1947) – short story writer and pro-Communist activist
Kristijonas Donelaitis (1714–1780) – Lithuanian Lutheran pastor and poet, author of The Seasons (Lithuanian: Metai)
Juozas Glinskis (1933–) – writer, playwright, pioneer of Lithuanian "theatre of cruelty"
Leah Goldberg (1911–1970) – Israeli poet
Romualdas Granauskas (1939–) – writer about the identity crisis during the Soviet times
Juozas Grušas (1901–1986) – one of the most productive writers and playwrights under the Soviet rule
Jurga Ivanauskaitė (1961–2007) – the best known modern female writer
Vincas Krėvė-Mickevičius (1882–1954) – writer and playwright, author of major interwar plays
Vincas Kudirka (1858–1899) – writer and poet, author of the national anthem of Lithuania
Vytautas V. Landsbergis (1962–) (:lt:Vytautas V. Landsbergis) – writer, published many children's books
Maironis (real name Jonas Mačiulis, 1862–1932) – priest and poet, best known patriotic poet
Justinas Marcinkevičius (1930–2011) – one of the most prominent poets during the Soviet rule
Marcelijus Martinaitis (1936–2013) (:lt:Marcelijus Martinaitis) – writer famous for The Ballads of Kukutis, a mock-epic
Martynas Mažvydas (1510–1563) – author of the first book in Lithuanian language
Icchokas Meras (1934–2014) – Lithuanian-Jewish writer about the Holocaust
Adam Mickiewicz (1798–1855) – Polish-Lithuanian-Belorussian poet, dramatist, essayist, publicist, translator and political activist
Oskaras Milašius (1877–1939) – French-Lithuanian writer and diplomat
Vincas Mykolaitis-Putinas (1893–1967) – writer and poet, one of the best known Symbolist poets, author of the novel In the Shadows of the Altars (Lithuanian: Altorių šešėly)
Salomėja Nėris (real name Salomėja Bačinskaitė-Bučienė, 1904–1945) – the best known female poet during the interwar period
Alfonsas Nyka-Niliūnas (1919–) (:lt:Alfonsas Nyka-Niliūnas) – poet, living in the United States
Henrikas Radauskas (1910–1970) – poet, one of the major figures of Lithuanian literature in exile
Šatrijos Ragana (real name Marija Pečkauskaitė, 1877–1930) – female writer
Ignas Sarkauskas (1992–) – patriotic poet, famous for "Matrica" 
Balys Sruoga (1896–1947) – writer, poet, playwright, author of the novel Forest of the Gods (Lithuanian: Dievų miškas) about his experience in the Stutthof concentration camp
Antanas Strazdas (1760–1833) – priest and poet, signed in Polish as Antoni Drozdowski; best known work was Pulkim ant Keliu (Let Us Fall on Our Knees) and the poem The Thrush
Antanas Škėma (1911–1961) – writer in exile, author of surrealistic novel The White Cloth (Lithuanian: Balta drobulė)
 Yemima Tchernovitz-Avidar (1909–1998) – Israeli author
Juozas Tumas-Vaižgantas (real name Juozas Tumas, 1869–1933) – priest and writer
Judita Vaičiūnaitė (1937–2001) (:lt:Judita Vaičiūnaitė) – modern female poet exploring urban settings
Indrė Valantinaitė (1984–) – poet
Tomas Venclova (1937–) – poet, political activist
Antanas Vienuolis (real name Žukauskas 1882–1957) – writer, major figure in Lithuanian prose
Vydūnas (real name Vilius Storostas, 1868–1953) – Lithuanian writer and philosopher, leader of Lithuanian cultural movement in the Lithuania Minor at the beginning of the 20th century
Jonas Zdanys (1950–) – poet and translator
Žemaitė (real name Julija Beniuševičiūtė-Žymantienė, 1845–1921) – one of the best known female writers

Theater and cinema 

Regimantas Adomaitis (1937–) – theatre and film actor, successful both in Lithuania and Russia
Donatas Banionis (1924–2014) – actor, star of Tarkovsky's Solaris
Šarūnas Bartas (1964–) – modern film director
Artūras Barysas (1954–2005) – "counter-culture" actor, singer, photographer, and filmmaker, known as the father of modern Lithuanian avant-garde
Charles Bronson (1921–2003) – well-known actor
Ingeborga Dapkūnaitė (1963–) – internationally successful actress
Gediminas Girdvainis (1944–) (:lt:Gediminas Girdvainis) – prolific theatre and movie actor
Laurence Harvey (1928–1973) – British actor
Rolandas Kazlas (1969–) – comedy actor
Oskaras Koršunovas (1969–) – modern theater director
Jurgis Mačiūnas (1931–1978) – initiator of Fluxus movement
Vaiva Mainelytė (1948–) (:lt:Vaiva Mainelytė) – popular actress remembered for the leading role in Bride of the Devil
Arūnas Matelis (1961–) – acclaimed documentary director
Adolfas Mekas (1925–2011) – film director, writer, editor, actor, educator
Jonas Mekas (1922–2019) – filmmaker, the godfather of American avant-garde cinema
Matas Metlevski (2003–) – actor
Aurelija Mikušauskaitė (1937–1974) – television and theatre actress
Juozas Miltinis (1907–1994) – theater director from Panevėžys
Nijolė Narmontaitė (1959–) (:lt:Nijolė Narmontaitė) – actress
Eimuntas Nekrošius (1952–2018) – theater director
Sean Penn (1960–) – U.S. actor, director, filmmaker
Algimantas Puipa (1951–) (:lt:Algimantas Puipa) – film director

John C. Reilly (1965–) – U.S. actor, comedian, singer, screenwriter, musician and producer
Sharune (1990–) – actress
Estanislao Shilinsky (1911–1985) – comedian, highly beloved representative of the Golden Age of Mexican cinema
Džiugas Siaurusaitis (1971–) (:lt:Džiugas Siaurusaitis) – actor, television presenter, humorist
Kostas Smoriginas (1953–) (:lt:Kostas Smoriginas) – popular actor and singer
Viktoras Starošas (1921–2016) – theatre and film director, director of many successful Lithuanian documentaries
Vytautas Šapranauskas (1958–2013) (:lt:Vytautas Šapranauskas) – theater and film actor, television presenter, humorist
James Tratas (1989–) – actor and model
Sakalas Uždavinys (1962–) (:lt:Sakalas Uždavinys) – theater and film actor, director
Jonas Vaitkus (1944–) – theater director, director of Utterly Alone
Adolfas Večerskis (1949–) – theatre and film actor, director of theatre
Arbuzas Žebriūnas (1930–2013) (:lt:Arūnas Žebriūnas) – one of the most prominent film directors during the Soviet rule
Jason Sudeikis - U.S. actor, comedian, film director

Ballet and dance 
 Edita Daniūtė (1979–) – professional ballroom dancer and World DanceSport Champion
 Iveta Lukosiute (1980–) – professional ballroom dancer and World 10 Dance Champion
 Eglė Špokaitė (1971–) – soloist of Lithuanian National Opera and Ballet Theatre (1989–2011), actress, art director

Music 

Linas Adomaitis (1976–) – pop singer, participant in the Eurovision Song Contest
Osvaldas Balakauskas (1937–) – ambassador and classical composer
Algirdas Budrys (1939–) – clarinetist
Alanas Chošnau (1974–) – singer, member of former music group Naktinės Personos
Mikalojus Konstantinas Čiurlionis (1875–1911) – painter and composer
Egidijus Dragūnas (1976–) (:lt:Egidijus Dragūnas) – leader of Sel, one of the first hip hop bands in Lithuania
Balys Dvarionas (1904–1972) – composer, conductor, pianist, professor
Viktorija Faith (1986-) – singer, producer
Mirga Gražinytė-Tyla (1986–) – conductor, music director of the City of Birmingham Symphony Orchestra
Gintaras Januševičius (1985–) – internationally acclaimed pianist
Gintarė Jautakaitė – pop artist,signed with EMI and SONY Music Entertainment in 1998
Algirdas Kaušpėdas – architect and lead singer of Antis
Nomeda Kazlaus – opera singer (dramatic soprano) appearing internationally
Vytautas Kernagis (1951–2008) – one of the most popular bards
Anthony Kiedis (1962–) – U.S. singer-songwriter and rapper, best known for being a founding member and lead vocalist of the Red Hot Chili Peppers
Algis Kizys (1960–) – long-time bass player of post-punk, no-wave band Swans
Irma Kliauzaitė – pianist 
Petras Kunca (1942–) – violinist 
Monika Linkytė (1992–) – pop singer
Andrius Mamontovas (1967–) – rock singer, co-founder of Foje and LT United
Marijonas Mikutavičius (1971–) – singer, author of "Trys Milijonai", the unofficial sports anthem in Lithuania
Vincas Niekus (1886–1938) (:lt:Vincas Niekus) – composer
Virgilijus Noreika (1935–) – one of the most successful opera singers (tenor)
Mykolas Kleopas Oginskis (1765–1833) – one of the best composer of the late 18th century
Kipras Petrauskas (1885–1968) (:lt:Kipras Petrauskas) – popular early opera singer (tenor)
Pink – pop, pop-rock, R&B singer-songwriter, dancer, producer
Stasys Povilaitis (1947–2015) – one of the popular singers during the Soviet period
Violeta Riaubiškytė (1974–) – pop singer, TV show host
Mindaugas Rojus – opera singer (tenor / baritone)
Česlovas Sasnauskas (1867–1916) – composer
Rasa Serra (1975–) (:lt:Rasa Serra) (real name Rasa Veretenčevienė) – singer (Traditional folk A cappella, jazz, POP)
Audronė Simonaitytė-Gaižiūnienė (1944–) (:lt:Audronė Gaižiūnienė-Simonaitytė) – one of the more popular female opera singers (soprano)
Virgis Stakėnas (1953–) (:lt:Virgis Stakėnas) – singer of country-folk music
Antanas Šabaniauskas (1903–1987) (:lt:Antanas Šabaniauskas) – singer (tenor)
Jurga Šeduikytė (1980–) – art rock musician, won the Best Female Act and the Best Album of 2005 in the Lithuanian Bravo Awards and the Best Baltic Act at the MTV Europe Music Awards 2007
Jonas Švedas (1908–1971) – composer
Violeta Urmanavičiūtė-Urmana – opera singer (soprano-mezzo-soprano) appearing internationally
Anthony Kiedis - singer (lead of Red Hot Chilli Peppers)

Painters and graphic artists 

Valentinas Ajauskas (1948–) (:lt:Valentinas Ajauskas) – painter
Robertas Antinis (1898–1981) – sculptor
Vytautas Ciplijauskas (1927–) (:lt:Vytautas Ciplijauskas) – painter
Jonas Čeponis (1926–) (:lt:Jonas Čeponis (1926)) – painter
M. K. Čiurlionis (1875–1911) – painter and composer; Asteroid 2420 Čiurlionis is named for him
Kostas Dereškevičius (1937–) (:lt:Kostas Dereškevičius) – painter
Vladimiras Dubeneckis (1888–1932) – painter, architect
Stasys Eidrigevičius (1949–) – graphic artist
Pranas Gailius (1928–) (:lt:Pranas Gailius) – painter
Paulius Galaunė
Petronėlė Gerlikienė (1905–1979) – self-taught Lithuanian-American artist
Algirdas Griškevičius (1954–) (:lt:Algirdas Griškevičius)
Vincas Grybas (1890–1941) – sculptor
Leonardas Gutauskas (1938–) (:lt:Leonardas Gutauskas) – painter, writer
Vytautas Ignas (1924–2009) (:lt:Vytautas Ignas) – painter
Vytautas Kairiūkštis (1890–1961) (:lt:Vytautas Kairiūkštis (1890)) – painter, art critic
Petras Kalpokas (1880–1945) – painter
Rimtas Kalpokas (1908–1999) (:lt:Rimtas Kalpokas) – painter, graphic artist
Vytautas Kasiulis (1918–1995) (:lt:Vytautas Kasiulis) – painter, graphic artist, stage designer
Leonas Katinas (1907–1984) (:lt:Leonas Katinas) – painter
Povilas Kaupas (1898–1978) (:lt:Povilas Kaupas)
Algimantas Kezys (1928–) Lithuanian-American photographer
Vincas Kisarauskas (1934–1988) (:lt:Vincas Kisarauskas) – painter, graphic artist, stage designer
Saulutė Stanislava Kisarauskienė (1937) (:lt:Saulutė Stanislava Kisarauskienė) – graphic artist, painter
Stasys Krasauskas (1929–1977) (:lt:Stasys Krasauskas) – graphic artist
Stanislovas Kuzma (1947–2012) (:lt:Stanislovas Kuzma) – sculptor
Antanas Martinaitis (1939–1986) (:lt:Antanas Martinaitis (1939)) – painter
Grytė Pintukaitė (1977–) – portrait painter
Jonas Rimša (1903–1978) (:lt:Jonas Rimša (1903)) – painter
Jan Rustem (1762–1835) – painter
Antanas Samuolis (1899–1942) (:lt:Antanas Samuolis) – painter
Šarūnas Sauka (1958–) – painter
Boris Schatz (1867–1932) – sculptor and founder of the Bezalel Academy
Irena Sibley née Pauliukonis (1944–2009) – children's book author and illustrator
Algis Skačkauskas (1955–2009) – painter
Franciszek Smuglewicz (1745–1807) – painter
Yehezkel Streichman – Israeli painter
Kazys Šimonis (1887–1978) – painter
Algimantas Švėgžda (1941–1996) (:lt:Algimantas Švėgžda) – painter
Otis Tamašauskas (1947–) – lithographer, printmaker, graphic artist
Vytautas Tomaševičius (1972–) – painter
Adolfas Valeška (1905–1994) – painter and graphic artist
Adomas Varnas (1879–1979) – painter
Kazys Varnelis (1917–2010) – artist
Vladas Vildžiūnas (1932–) (:lt:Vladas Vildžiūnas) – sculptor
Mikalojus Povilas Vilutis (1944–) (:lt:Mikalojus Povilas Vilutis) – graphic artist
Viktoras Vizgirda (1904–1993) – painter
William Zorach (1889–1966) – modern artist who died in Bath, Maine
Antanas Žmuidzinavičius (1876–1966) – painter
Kazimieras Leonardas Žoromskis (1913–2004) – painter

Politics 

Valdas Adamkus (1926–) – President of Lithuania till 2009
Algirdas (1296–1377) – co-ruler (together with Kęstutis) of Lithuania (1345–1377)
Magdalena Avietėnaitė (1892–1984) – journalist, diplomat, public figure
Jonas Basanavičius (1851–1927) – "father" of the Act of Independence of 1918
Algirdas Brazauskas (1932–2010) – former First secretary of Central Committee of Communist Party of Lithuanian SSR, the former president of Lithuania after 1990, and former Prime Minister of Lithuania
Joe Fine (1895–1969) – mayor of Marquette, Michigan 1964–1965
Gediminas (1275–1345) – king of Lithuania (1316–1341)
Kazys Grinius (1866–1950) – politician, third President of Lithuania
Dalia Grybauskaitė (1956–) – 8th President of Lithuania (2009–2019)
Jogaila (1362–1434) – ruler of Lithuania (1377–1434, from 1392 to 1430 together with Vytautas); king of Poland (1386–1434)
Ramūnas Karbauskis (1969–) – businessman, politician and philanthropist
Kęstutis (1297–1382) – co-ruler (together with Algirdas) of Lithuania (1342–1382)
Mykolas Krupavičius (1885–1970) – priest behind the land reform in interwar Lithuania
Vytautas Landsbergis (1932–) – politician, professor, leader of Sąjūdis, the independence movement, former speaker of Seimas, member of European Parliament
Stasys Lozoraitis (1898–1983) – diplomat and leader of Lithuanian government in exile (1940–1983)
Stasys Lozoraitis Jr. (1924–1994) – politician, diplomat, succeeded his father as leader of Lithuanian government in exile (1987–1991)
Visvaldas Mažonas (1941–), politician
Antanas Merkys (1888–1955) – last Prime Minister of interwar Lithuania
Mindaugas (1200–1263) – first king of Lithuania (1236–1263)
Gitanas Nausėda (1964–) – current President of Lithuania
Rolandas Paksas (1956–) – former President, removed from the office after impeachment
Justas Paleckis (1899–1980) – journalist and politician, puppet Prime Minister after Soviet occupation
Kazimiera Prunskienė (1943–) – first female Prime Minister
Jonušas Radvila (1612–1655) – field hetman of Grand Duchy of Lithuania (1654–1655)
Mykolas Sleževičius (1882–1939) – three time Prime Minister, organized Lithuanian Armed Forces
Antanas Smetona (1874–1944) – first President (1919) and authoritarian leader (1926–1941)
Antanas Sniečkus (1903–1974) – First Secretary of the Lithuanian Communist Party (1940–1974)
Aleksandras Stulginskis (1885–1969) – President of Lithuania in the interwar period
Antanas Terleckas (1928–) (:lt:Antanas Terleckas) – political activist
Juozas Urbšys (1896–1991) – last Foreign Minister of interwar Lithuania
Gediminas Vagnorius (1957–) – Prime Minister behind vagnorkės, the temporary currency
Augustinas Voldemaras (1883–1942) – Prime Minister to Antanas Smetona
Vytautas (1350–1430) – ruler of Lithuania(1392–1430 together with Jogaila)
Artūras Zuokas (1968–) – recurring mayor of Vilnius city municipality

Military 

Antanas Gustaitis (1898–1941) – Lithuanian Air Force, commander-in-chief, general, engineer, military aircraft designer (ANBO series)
Romualdas Marcinkus (1907–1944) – only Lithuanian pilot to serve in the Royal Air Force (RAF) during the Second World War
Povilas Plechavičius (1890–1973) 
Rimantas Stankevičius (1944–1990) – Lithuanian cosmonaut who test flew Soviet space shuttle Buran and its test vehicles
Jonas Žemaitis – Lithuanian partisan leader during second Soviet occupation, recognized as a fourth president of Lithuania

Science 

Kazys Almenas – physicist, writer and essayist
Antanas Andrijauskas – habilitated doctor
Algirdas Avižienis (1932– ) (:lt:Algirdas Antanas Avižienis) – extensive research in fault-tolerance
Jurgis Baltrušaitis junior – art-historian, expert of medieval art
Povilas Brazdžiūnas (1897–1986) – (:lt:Povilas Brazdžiūnas) science of modern physics organisator in Lithuania
Kazimieras Būga – linguist
Simonas Daukantas – Lithuanian historian, who wrote first book on history of Lithuania in Lithuanian language
Jurgis Dobkevičius – aircraft designer
Birutė Galdikas – anthropologist
Marija Gimbutienė – archeologist
Ben Goertzel – artificial intelligence researcher
Alexander Goldberg – Israeli chemical engineer and President of the Technion – Israel Institute of Technology
Vytautas Andrius Graičiūnas – management theorist
Algirdas Julius Greimas – linguist who contributed to the theory of semiotics, and also researched Lithuanian mythology
Aleksandras Griškevičius (1809–1863) – (:lt:Aleksandras Griškevičius) pioneer of aviation in Lithuania
Jonas Jablonskis – Lithuanian practical linguist, founder of Standard Lithuanian
Adolfas Jucys – physicist, pioneer of theory of many-electron atoms in Lithuania
Aaron Klug – physicist and chemist, and winner of the 1982 Nobel Prize in Chemistry
Algis Petras Piskarskas (1942– ) – (:lt:Algis Petras Piskarskas) pioneer of laser physics and nonlinear optics in Lithuania
Juras Požela – (1925–2016) (:lt:Juras Požela (1925)) pioneer of plasma physics and semiconductor physics schools in Lithuania
Kazimieras Simonavičius – artillery and rocket scientist
Konstantinas Sirvydas – first Lithuanian lexicographer
Vytautas Straižys – astronomer
Laima Vaitkunskienė - archaeologist

Mathematics 

Aldona Aleškevičienė (Statulevičienė) – probability theory and stochastic processes
Raimundas Bentkus – probability theory and stochastic processes
Vidmantas Bentkus – probability theory, functional analysis, number theory
Algimantas Jonas Bikelis – probability theory and stochastic processes
Vaclovas Bliznikas – differential geometry
Antanas Kestutis Bulota – number theory
Bronius Grigelionis – probability theory and stochastic processes
Kleopas Grincevicius – differential geometry
Feliksas Ivanauskas – numerical analysis
Jonas Kubilius – number theory, recipient of Order of the Lithuanian Grand Duke Gediminas, university rector
Antanas Laurincikas – number theory
Eugenijus Manstavicius – number theory
Hermann Minkowski – number theory, mathematical physics, and the theory of relativity
Vygantas I. Paulauskas – probability theory and stochastic processes
Vytautas Statulevicius – probability theory and stochastic processes
Donatas Surgailis – probability theory and stochastic processes

Economy 

Hubertas Grušnys
Juozas Kazickas
Bronislovas Lubys
Darius Mockus
Nerijus Numavičius
Jurga Žilinskienė

Sports

Basketball 

Dainius Adomaitis – former basketball player, current BC Neptūnas and Lithuania men's national basketball team coach 
Ramūnas Butautas
Valdemaras Chomičius
Gintaras Einikis
Vladas Garastas – former coach and president of the Lithuanian Basketball Federation
Martynas Gecevičius
Žydrūnas Ilgauskas – former NBA player, most famous for his long tenure with the Cleveland Cavaliers
Paulius Jankūnas
Simas Jasaitis
Šarūnas Jasikevičius – former NBA player, four-time Euroleague champion, 2005 Israeli Basketball Premier League MVP, current BC Žalgiris coach
Robertas Javtokas – one-time Euroleague champion
Mantas Kalnietis
Artūras Karnišovas
Rimantas Kaukėnas
Jonas Kazlauskas
Kęstutis Kemzūra
Linas Kleiza – former NBA player with Denver Nuggets and Toronto Raptors
Gintaras Krapikas
Rimas Kurtinaitis
Mindaugas Kuzminskas – former NBA player with New York Knicks
Darjuš Lavrinovič
Kšyštof Lavrinovič
Darius Lukminas
Arvydas Macijauskas
Jonas Mačiulis
Šarūnas Marčiulionis – one of the first Europeans to play in the NBA; largely responsible for resurrecting the Lithuania men's national team after the re-establishment of the country's independence; member of the Naismith Memorial Basketball Hall of Fame and the FIBA Hall of Fame
Donatas Motiejūnas – former NBA player with the New Orleans Pelicans
Tomas Pačėsas
Modestas Paulauskas – four-time European Champion, two-time World Champion and Olympic Champion; seven times awarded as Lithuanian Sportsman of the Year
Marijonas Petravičius
Martynas Pocius
Virginijus Praškevičius
Arvydas Sabonis – considered one of the Greatest Basketball Players of All-Time; At the end of his career, played for the (USA) NBA's Portland Trail Blazers; represented both the USSR and post-Soviet Lithuania internationally; member of the Naismith Memorial and FIBA Halls of Fame
Domantas Sabonis – son of Arvydas, played two seasons of U.S. college basketball at Gonzaga before declaring for the 2016 NBA draft
Antanas Sireika
Deividas Sirvydis (born 2000) – basketball player in the Israel Basketball Premier League
Darius Songaila – former NBA player
Ramūnas Šiškauskas – EuroLeague star, nicknamed Lithuanian Scottie Pippen
Saulius Štombergas – one of the most successful players in Lithuania
Jurgita Štreimikytė – former WNBA player
Mindaugas Timinskas
Edgaras Ulanovas
Jonas Valančiūnas – current NBA player with the New Orleans Pelicans
Eurelijus Žukauskas
Mindaugas Žukauskas

Cyclists 
Ignatas Konovalovas
Simona Krupeckaitė
Ramūnas Navardauskas
Jolanta Polikevičiūtė
Rasa Polikevičiūtė
Edita Pučinskaitė
Raimondas Rumšas
Gintautas Umaras
Zita Urbonaitė
Tomas Vaitkus
Diana Žiliūtė

Football

Hockey 
Darius Kasparaitis – former NHL player
Aleksey Nikiforov – professional coach and mentor
Pijus Rulevičius – current USHL player with Chicago Steel
Dainius Zubrus – former NHL player

Tennis

Ričardas Berankis – professional tennis player 
Vitas Gerulaitis – professional tennis player in the 70s & 80s; won the Australian Open in 1978; twice runner-up to Bjorn Borg
 Paulina Peled, nee Peisachov (born 1950) - Israeli tennis player
 Daniel Prenn (1904–1991) – Vilnius-born German, Polish, and British world-top-ten tennis player

Track and field

Virgilijus Alekna – two-time Olympic, two-time World and one-time European champion in discus throwing
Austra Skujytė – Olympic medalist in women's heptathlon

Various 
Rokas Baciuška - rally driver
Viktorija Čmilytė – chess Grandmaster
Margarita Drobiazko – ice dancer bronze medal at the European Championships (2000, 2006) and at World Championships (2000)
Rūta Garkauskaitė – professional table tennis player, former European Champion single (2008), double mixed (2000, 2005, 2007, 2008, 2009) and double women (2010, 2011)
Daina Gudzinevičiūtė – Olympic gold medalist in shooting
Ieva Januškevičiūtė – Olympic alpine ski racer
Antanas Juknevičius – driver, seven-time Dakar Rally competitioner
Natas Kaupas – professional skateboarder, one of the first innovators of street style skateboarding in the 1980s
Markas Luckis – chess player
Rūta Meilutytė – Olympic gold medalist at the 2012 Olympic Games in the women's 100m breaststroke
Vladas Mikėnas – chess player
Remigijus Morkevičius – Muay Thai kickboxer and MMA fighter
Rose Namajunas – UFC Straw Weight champion of the world
Kęstutis Navickas – badminton player
Živilė Raudonienė – professional fitness competitor, winner of IFBB Arnolds Classic 2009 and professional wrestler
Eugenijus Riabovas – head coach of Hearts FC
Žydrūnas Savickas – 4-time winner of the World's Strongest Man Contest; 8-time winner of the Arnold Strongman Classic 1st place
Tony G (real name Antanas Guoga) – world poker star, born in Kaunas
Benediktas Vanagas – rally driver
Povilas Vanagas – figure skater, ice dancer; bronze medal at the European Championships (2000, 2006) and at World Championships (2000)
Kazimieras Vasiliauskas – first driver, competing at international open-wheel racing level
Marius Žaromskis – MMA fighter and Dream tournament winner
Aurimas Bakchis - Formula D driver

Religion

Roman Catholicism 

Audrys Bačkis
Šv. Kazimieras
Archbishop Blessed Jurgis Matulaitis-Matulevičius
Archbishop Mečislovas Reinys
Alfonsas Svarinskas (1925–2014) (:lt:Alfonsas Svarinskas)
Motiejus Valančius – bishop of Samogitia, historian and writer
Kazimieras Vasiliauskas (1922–2001) (:lt:Kazimieras Vasiliauskas (1922)) – priest

Eastern Orthodoxy  
Charitina of Lithuania (died in 1281) – noblewoman turned ascetic and abbess
Daumantas of Pskov (died in 1299) – Lithuanian noble, became prince of Pskov and defender against the Teutonic Knights

Judaism 
Eliyahu Eliezer Dessler
Vilna Gaon
Avraham Yeshayahu Karelitz
Nissim Karelitz
Chaim Volozhin

Other 

Tadas Blinda – Lithuanian Robin Hood
Steponas Darius – pilot
Ignotas Domeika – Chilean geologist, mineralogist and educator
Gintautas Dumcius – editor of the Dorchester (MA) Reporter
Stasys Girėnas – pilot
Josifas Grigulevičius, also known as Григулевич Иосиф Ромуальдович (1913–1988) – famous Soviet intelligence agent in West Europe and Latin America, later historian of Catholic Church and Latin America (corresponding member of Academy of Sciences of USSR)
Juste Juozapaityte – model and pageant title holder
Jurgis Kairys – aerobatic pilot, FAI World Grand Prix of Aviation FAIWGPA champion, famous of flight under 10 bridges in Vilnius. He also flew inverted under a bridge in Kaunas
Romas Kalanta – high school student known for his public self-immolation protesting Soviet regime in Lithuania
Abba Kovner (1918–1987) – poet, writer, and partisan leader
Benediktas Mikulis – Lithuanian freedom fighter
Antanas Mockus (1952–) – Lithuano-Colombian mathematician, philosopher, and politician; mayor of the city of Bogotá D.C. in two mandates (1995–1997 and 2001–2003)
Vytautas Putna, also known as :ru:Путна, Витовт Казимирович (1893–1937) – comcor (general lieutenant) of Red Army, Soviet military diplomat
Shanina Shaik – model, maternally of Lithuanian-Australian descent
Jokūbas Smuškevičius, also known as Yakov Smushkevich, Смушкевич Яков Владимирович (1902–1941) – general lieutenant of Soviet Army, Commander-in Chief of Soviet Air Force, twice Hero of Soviet Union
Aleksandras Štromas (also referred to as Alexander Shtromas) (1931–1999) – professor of Bradford University, dissident
Jeronimas Uborevičius also known as :ru:Уборевич, Иероним Петрович or Ieronim Uborevich (1896–1937) – comandarm 1st rank (General of the Army) of the Red Army, commander of Armament of Red Army, later commander of military district
Feliksas Vaitkus – sixth pilot to fly solo across the Atlantic
Edita Vilkevičiūtė – model

Fictional 

Hannibal Lecter – fictional cannibalistic genius appearing in four novels by author Thomas Harris and their film adaptations
Lithuania – also known by his human name as Toris Laurinates, the representation of the country in the anime/manga Hetalia
Marko Ramius (nicknamed the Vilnius Schoolmaster) – fictional captain of the submarine Red October in the novel The Hunt for Red October by Tom Clancy; portrayed by Sean Connery in the 1990 film version
Jurgis Rudkus – protagonist of Upton Sinclair's novel The Jungle

Notable international people of Lithuanian descent 

Tim Abromaitis – NCAA basketball player
Giorgio Amendola (1907–1980) – Italian prominent politician; mother was Lithuanian
Saul Anuzis (1959–) – Chairman of the Michigan Republican State Committee (2005–present)
Rick Barry – Hall of Fame basketball player 
Aras Baskauskas – winner of Survivor: Panama; of Lithuanian descent, holding Lithuanian and American citizenship
Bernard Berenson – American art historian specializing in the Renaissance, born in Butrimonys (Alytus district, Lithuania)
Kevin Bieksa – Canadian hockey player
Sydney Brenner – biologist, winner of 2002 Nobel Prize in Physiology
Robert Briscoe – Lord Mayor of Dublin – The original family name in Lithuania is believed have been Cherrick
Charles Bronson – actor, born to Lithuanian emigrants
Dick Butkus – NFL Hall of Fame linebacker
Abraham Cahan (1860–1951) – Lithuanian-born American socialist activist, editor and journalist of socialist and Jewish periodicals (including The Jewish Daily Forward), and author of a number of fiction pieces concerning Yiddish life in New York
Leonard Cohen (1934–2016) – singer-songwriter, poet, novelist, and Rock and Roll Hall of Fame inductee
Dick Durbin – Illinois senator; mother was Lithuanian
Bob Dylan – American folk/rock musician
Brian Epstein – former Beatles manager; paternal grandparents are Lithuanian Jews
Brandon Flowers (1981–) – vocalist, and keyboardist of the Las Vegas-based rock band The Killers. Is under both Scottish and Lithuanian ancestry
Genie Francis – American actress; mother is of Lithuanian descent
Romain Gary (Roman Kacew) (1914–1980) – Lithuanian born naturalized French diplomat, novelist, film director, World War II aviator; the only author to have won the Prix Goncourt twice (under his own name and under a pseudonym)
Philip Glass (1937–) – composer (grandchild of Lithuanian Jewish migrants)
Emma Goldman – anarchist, feminist, activist aka 'Red Emma', Lithuania-born anarchist known for her writings and speeches
Nadine Gordimer – novelist and writer, winner of the 1991 Nobel Prize in literature and 1974 Booker Prize
Albin Gurklis – Lithuanian-American priest, mathematician
Laurence Harvey – Lithuanian-born actor who achieved fame in British and American films
Jascha Heifetz (1901–1987) – Lithuanian-born famous violinist
Ann Jillian (1950–) – American television actress and breast cancer activist, born to immigrant parents
Phill Jupitus – British comedian, family emigrated from Lithuania in 1917
Joe Jurevicius – American football (NFL) wide receiver
Natas Kaupas – professional skateboarder
Anthony Kiedis (1962–) – frontman and vocalist of the Red Hot Chili Peppers (paternal grandfather of Lithuanian descent)
Stanley Kunitz – noted American poet, mother was Lithuanian
James Laurinaitis – NFL linebacker for the St. Louis Rams
David Lee – physicist, winner of Nobel Prize in 1996 for physics
Ruta Lee (1936–) born Ruta Kilmonis (Kilmonytė) – Canadian and American cinema and television actress
Emmanuel Levinas – Lithuanian-born French philosopher and Talmudic commentator
Jacques Lipchitz – Lithuanian-born cubist sculptor
Billy McNeill – Scottish soccer legend, Lithuanian mother
Hermann Minkowski – Lithuanian-born German mathematician, one of Einstein's teachers
Antanas Mockus – Colombian mathematician, philosopher, and politician. Former mayor of Bogotá
Simonas Morkūnas (1902–1997) – priest, Lithuanian-American humanitarian
Ed Palubinskas – former basketball player
Sean Penn – American actor; father was of mixed Russian and Lithuanian descent
Vlado Perlemuter – French pianist, born in Kaunas
Pink – pop, pop-rock, R&B singer-songwriter, dancer, producer
Maury Povich – paternal grandparents emigrated from Lithuania
Johnny Ramensky – legendary Scottish criminal and folk hero
Andy Rautins – Canadian professional basketball player, son of Leo
Leo Rautins – Canadian basketball player, former national team coach, broadcaster
John C. Reilly – American actor; mother is of Lithuanian descent
Phil Rudd (real name Phillip Hugh Norman Witschke Rudzevecuis) – drummer of band AC/DC
Vyto Ruginis – American actor, son of Lithuanian immigrants
Jack Sharkey – American heavyweight boxing champion
William Shatner – Canadian actor, who played Captain James T. Kirk (one of the most iconic characters in American cultural history) on Star Trek, grandson of Lithuanian immigrants
Joanna Shimkus – actress born in Canada to Lithuanian emigres
John Shimkus – Illinois politician
Jerry Siegel (1914–1996) – co-creator of Superman; son of Lithuanian Jewish immigrants
Antanas Sileika – Canadian author
Elijah ben Solomon, known as the Vilna Gaon – Lithuanian-born talmudist, halachist, kabbalist, and one of the foremost leaders of non-hasidic Jewry of the past few centuries
Nik Stauskas – current NBA club Philadelphia 76ers player
Annis Stukus – Canadian sports personality
Jason Sudeikis – US actor and comedian, member of Saturday Night Live cast (paternal grandfather of Lithuanian descent)
Olegas Truchanas (1923–1972) – Lithuanian-born Australian conservationist and nature photographer
Johnny Unitas – football player with the Baltimore Colts, member of NFL Hall of Fame, parents were Lithuanian
Eddie Waitkus – baseball player
Uriel Weinreich (1926–1967) – Lithuanian-born linguist at Columbia University
Mariel Zagunis – Olympic (USA) sabre fencing champion, gold medals in 2004 and 2008
Robert Z'Dar – American actor
Robert Zemeckis – American film director
Annette Zilinskas – original bassist with the early Bangles
William Zorach (1887–1966) – Lithuanian-born American sculptor, painter, printmaker and writer

See also 
List of North European Jews
List of Poles
List of Belarusians
List of people by nationality

References 

 

cy:Lithiwaniad
lt:Wikipedia:Lietuvos asmenybės
nl:Litouwers